Neil or Neal Williams may refer to:

Neil Williams (artist) (1934–1988), American painter
Neil Williams (cricketer) (1962–2006), British cricketer
Neil Williams (pilot) (1934–1977), Welsh aerobatics pilot
Neil Williams (water polo) (1918–1998), New Zealand water polo player
Neal Williams (ecologist), American pollination ecologist
Neal H. Williams (1870–1956), American physicist
Neil 'Roberto' Williams (born 1978), British radio presenter
Neil Wynn Williams (1864–1940), British novelist and writer